HR 858 is a star with a planetary system located 104 light years from the Sun in the southern constellation of Fornax. It has a yellow-white hue and is visible to the naked eye but is a challenge to see with an apparent visual magnitude of 6.4. The star is drifting further away with a radial velocity of 10 km/s. It has an absolute magnitude of +3.82.

This object is a slightly-evolved F-type main-sequence star with a stellar classification of F6V, which indicates it is generating energy through core hydrogen fusion. It is roughly two billion years old and is spinning with a projected rotational velocity of 8.3 km/s. The star has 1.1 times the mass of the Sun and 1.3 times the Sun's radius. It is radiating 2.3 times the luminosity of the Sun from its photosphere at an effective temperature of 6,201 K.

It is most likely a red dwarf star.

Planetary system
In May 2019, it was announced to have at least 3 exoplanets as observed by transit method of the Transiting Exoplanet Survey Satellite. All three are orbiting close to the host star and appear to be super-Earths, about twice the size of the Earth. Components 'b' and 'c' may be in a 3:5 mean motion resonance.

References

External links
 in-the-sky.org

F-type main-sequence stars
Planetary systems with three confirmed planets
Binary stars
Fornax (constellation)
CD-31 1148
017926
013363
0858
M-type main-sequence stars
396